Jovana de la Cruz (born 12 July 1992) is a Peruvian long distance runner who specialises in the marathon. She competed in the women's marathon event at the 2016 Summer Olympics.

References

External links
 

1992 births
Living people
Peruvian female long-distance runners
Peruvian female marathon runners
Place of birth missing (living people)
Athletes (track and field) at the 2016 Summer Olympics
Athletes (track and field) at the 2020 Summer Olympics
Olympic athletes of Peru
20th-century Peruvian women
21st-century Peruvian women